David Chapman (born 30 October 1963) is a British sports shooter. He competed at the 1984 Summer Olympics and the 1992 Summer Olympics.

References

External links
 

1963 births
Living people
British male sport shooters
Olympic shooters of Great Britain
Shooters at the 1984 Summer Olympics
Shooters at the 1992 Summer Olympics
Sportspeople from Hitchin
20th-century British people